Ividia havanensis is a species of sea snail, a marine gastropod mollusk in the family Pyramidellidae, the pyrams and their allies.

Description
The shell attains a length of 2 mm.

Distribution
This species occurs in the following locations:
 Gulf of Mexico (Florida)
 Caribbean Sea (Colombia, Cuba, Virgin Islands)
 Atlantic Ocean (Northeast Brazil)

References

External links
 To Encyclopedia of Life
 To USNM Invertebrate Zoology Mollusca Collection
 To ITIS
 Gastropods.com: Miralda havanensis; retrieved : 7 November 2011

Pyramidellidae
Gastropods described in 1933